Alice M. Johnson (born April 1, 1941) is a Minnesota politician and former member of the Minnesota Senate. A member of the Minnesota Democratic–Farmer–Labor Party (DFL), she represented District 37 in the northern Twin Cities metropolitan area.

Education
Johnson attended Metropolitan State University, Minneapolis Community College—graduating with an A.A., Concordia University—graduating with a B.A., and Harvard University—graduating with a M.A. in 1996.

Minnesota House of Representatives
Johnson was first elected to the Minnesota House of Representatives in 1986 and was re-elected every two years until she retired in 2000.

1992 congressional campaign
Johnson ran unsuccessfully for election to the United States House of Representatives in 1992. She lost the DFL endorsement to Gary Sikorski.

Minnesota Senate
Johnson was first elected to the Minnesota Senate in 2012. She did not seek re-election in 2016.

Personal life
Johnson was married to Richard H. Jefferson, who served in the Minnesota House of Representatives from 1987 to 1999. They reside in Spring Lake Park, Minnesota. She is a retired chemist who worked for the United States Bureau of Mines.

References

External links

1941 births
Living people
Women state legislators in Minnesota
Members of the Minnesota House of Representatives
Minnesota state senators
People from Spring Lake Park, Minnesota
Harvard University alumni
21st-century American politicians
Concordia University (Saint Paul, Minnesota) alumni
Metropolitan State University alumni
American chemists
21st-century American women politicians